Hard For Measy For You is an album by the American indie band Guv'ner. It was released by Ecstatic Peace! in the US and Wiiija Records in the UK in 1994. Drumming duties on the album were shared by Brian Logan (plays on "No Big Deal", "Bridge Under Water" and "Making Headlines") and Jamie Lawrence ("Red Velvet Chair", "Go To Sleep" and "Wild Couple").

Track listing
 "Drummer Want-Ad"
 "No Big Deal"
 "Red Velvet Chair"
 "Little Bitch on the Phone"
 "Bridge Under Water"
 "Almond Roca"
 "Making Headlines"
 "Go to Sleep"
 "Wild Couple"
 "Touch Wood"
 "Amplituden"
 "And also..."
 "I Will Get You"
 "Thespian Girl"
 "She Dog Stop"

Personnel
Charles Gansa (guitar, vocals)
Pumpkin Wentzel (bass, vocals)
Brian Logan (drums)
Jamie Lawrence (drums)

External links
Hard For Measy For You on Ecstatic Peace!

1994 albums